Schistura magnifluvis is a species of ray-finned fish, a stone loach, in the genus Schistura. It is found in the middle Mekong basin in Thailand and Laos, from the Nam Heung basin to the  Xe Don system, it probably occurs in Cambodia too. It is found in streams and rivers, including the nmain channel of the Mekong, in stretches of moderate to fast current over a variety of substrates from mud to stone.

References

M
Fish described in 1990